Mathias Vacek (born 12 June 2002) is a Czech cyclist, who currently rides for UCI WorldTeam . He also competed in cross-country skiing. His older brother Karel is also a cyclist.

He is set to join  in 2023 after riding the second half of 2022 season as stagiaire.

Major results

2019
 4th Overall Saarland Trofeo
 6th Road race, UEC European Junior Road Championships
2020
 1st  Time trial, UEC European Junior Road Championships
 National Junior Road Championships
1st  Time trial
2nd Road race
2021
 3rd Time trial, National Under-23 Road Championships
 5th Road race, National Road Championships
 6th Overall Grand Prix Jeseníky
2022
 1st  Time trial, National Under-23 Road Championships
 1st Stage 6 UAE Tour
 UCI Road World Under-23 Championships
2nd  Road race
9th Time trial
 2nd  Road race, UEC European Under-23 Road Championships
 3rd Overall Grand Prix Jeseníky
1st  Young rider classification
1st Prologue
 6th Veneto Classic
 10th Overall Tour de l'Avenir
2023
 8th Figueira Champions Classic

References

External links

2002 births
Living people
Czech male cyclists
People from Beroun
Czech male cross-country skiers
Cross-country skiers at the 2020 Winter Youth Olympics
Sportspeople from the Central Bohemian Region